Fields of Fire is a 1987 Australian mini series about cane cutters in Queensland just prior to and during World War Two.

Plot
In 1938, Englishman Bluey arrives in the north Queensland town of Silkwood. Two sisters are interested in him, Kate and Dusty. Their mother is Silkwood's matriarch.

Production
The budget was $4 million, $150,000 of which came from the Queensland Film Corporation. It was shot in Harwood Island, Ulmarra, Clarence River.

Fields of Fire II

Fields of Fire II is a 1988 sequel set in the late 1940s.

Plot
In 1946 Franco becomes a black marketeer and marries Gina. Bluey marries Dusty after the war.

Fields of Fire III

There was a third Fields of Fire in 1988 which dealt with the story in the 1950s.

Plot
In 1951 Gina and her brother Paolo are successful cane growers. Gina is attracted to Rinaldo. The Menzies government holds an anti-communist referendum.

Main cast list

References

External links
Fields of Fire at IMDb
Fields of Fire II at IMDb
Fields of Fire III at IMDb

1987 Australian television series debuts
1987 Australian television series endings
1980s Australian television miniseries
English-language television shows